Chongtham Mehul (born 10 February 1989) is an Indian cricketer. He made his List A debut on 1 March 2021, for Manipur in the 2020–21 Vijay Hazare Trophy. He made his Twenty20 debut on 8 November 2021, for Manipur in the 2021–22 Syed Mushtaq Ali Trophy.

References

External links
 

1989 births
Living people
Indian cricketers
Manipur cricketers
Place of birth missing (living people)